Realm of the Skelataur is the fourteenth studio album by the Australian Christian extreme metal band Mortification. It was released on 9 March 2015. A reissue was released on Soundmass in 2022 with a second disc containing a live recording to celebrate the band's 25th anniversary at EasterFest on 3 April 2015.

Title 
Jefferson Guedes Giammelaro wrote "The Mortification has already announced some time ago that it would launch a new CD, and now the band released the name of the work, which will be "Realm Of The Skelator", and is already in pre-production phase.

Steve Rowe said that it would be brutal, and have a mixture of styles like death metal, grindcore, thrash metal and traditional heavy metal.

The album has strong tendencies to CDs Break The Curse (1990) Scrolls of the Megilloth (1992) and EnVision EvAngelene (1996).

Recording took place between September 2014 to October 2014, with the sound engineer Mark McCormack.

Critical reception 
Peter John Willboughby reported "It is worth mentioning that the production on here is much better than their previous album and makes a fitting end to the Australian megabeast that is Mortification."

Parat Magazine stated "In March MORTFICATION reminded the new album 'Realm Of The Skeletaur,' which was the reason for Steve to reach out and ask him lots of attractions. Whether his confession what he wants, one must leave: It's a tremendously brave man who fell through hard music. Despite the fact that it is almost paralyzed and plagued him and many other health problems."

Matthias Salomon reports "If I had to describe 'Realm Of The Skeletaur' with an adjective, it would be 'funny'. Perhaps it is because death metal and Christian world views are not all too well tolerated. Perhaps, however, it is only the compulsive attempt to put prefabricated texts into some melodies. But somehow there is also much cult in this album and in MORTIFICATION. Whoever has been passing through his own thing for so long, may well be a curious addition to the metallic encyclopaedia."

Track listing

Personnel 

Mortification
Steve Rowe – vocals, bass guitar
Lincoln Bowen – guitars
Andrew Esnouf – drums

Production
Mark McCormack – producer, mixing, mastering
Steve Rowe – producer, mixing, pre-production
Lincoln Bowen – producer, mixing
Neil Kearan (Nak Recording) – pre-production, pre-production engineering

Additional personnel
Michael Maxwell – cover artwork
Brent Furtelli, Jason Parkin – photography
Tobias Jäpel – layout (original version)
Scott Waters (Ultimatum) – design, layout (2022 version)
AceMedia Productions – live audio (Live 2015)

References 

Mortification (band) albums
2015 albums